Dmitry Konstantinovich Faddeev (30 June 1907 – 20 October 1989) was a Soviet mathematician.

Biography
Dmitry was born June 30, 1907, about 200 kilometers southwest of Moscow on his father's estate. His father Konstantin Tikhonovich Faddeev was an engineer while his mother was a doctor and appreciator of music who instilled the love for music in Dmitry. Friends found his piano playing entertaining.

In 1928 he graduated from Petrograd State University, as it was then called. His teachers included Ivan Matveyevich Vinogradov and Boris Nicolaevich Delone. In 1930 he married Vera Nicolaevna Zamyatina and in 1934 she gave birth to Lyudvig Dmitrievich Faddeev who grew up to be a physicist.

Contributions
Dmitry and his wife co-authored Numerical Methods in Linear Algebra in 1960, followed by an enlarged edition in 1963. For instance, they developed an idea of Urbain Leverrier to produce an algorithm to find the resolvent matrix  of a given matrix A. By iteration, the method computed the adjugate matrix and characteristic polynomial for A.

Dmitry was committed to mathematics education and aware of the need for graded sets of mathematical exercises. With Iliya Samuilovich Sominskii he wrote Problems in Higher Algebra.

He was one of the founders of the Russian Mathematical Olympiads. He was one of the founders of the a Physics-Mathematics secondary school later named after him.

See also
Faddeev–LeVerrier algorithm

References

External links
 

1907 births
1989 deaths
20th-century Russian mathematicians
Algebraists
Recipients of the USSR State Prize
Corresponding Members of the USSR Academy of Sciences
Saint Petersburg State University alumni